Molly Dodd (November 11, 1921 — March 26, 1981) was an American actress.

Biography 
Born as Mary Elise Dodd in Los Angeles, California to Rev. Neal Dodd (September 6, 1879 — May 26, 1966) and Lila Elsie Dodd (née Weaver; September 12, 1889 — March 28, 1949), her father was a priest of the Anglo-Catholic Episcopal Church.

Dodd began her career on the Los Angeles stage in 1939, debuting in a revival of the play The Cradle Song with the Westwood Theatre Guild. Her performance in The Penguin (1940), at the Call Board Theatre in Hollywood, was reviewed as demonstrating unusual eccentric comedy gifts. That same year, she appeared in And Eternal Darkness at the Call Board and the review read, "Molly Dodd as the love interest was appealing."

In February 1947, Dodd received a citation from the USO for her performance in Noël Coward's Private Lives at United States Army camps. She acted in numerous stage productions through the years, including summer stock in La Jolla.

Dodd was in only four theatrical movies. She first appeared as a beautician in Hitchcock's Vertigo (1958) starring James Stewart and Kim Novak. She also appeared as Mrs. Rigg in What's the Matter with Helen? (1971), which was written by her husband, writer Henry Farrell, and starred Debbie Reynolds and Shelley Winters.  In 1965, Dodd and actor/writer Robert Lansing formed the State Repertory Theatre as a rallying ground for professional actors who wanted to do plays outside the realm of commercial theatre. They did various productions – Spoon River Anthology, a concert titled From Our Bag, Pirandello's As You Desire Me, and a double-bill titled Those Mad Victorians, which the company took to Caltech in the late 1960s. When they returned to Caltech the following season, they performed An Evening With Oscar Wilde, a concert reading based on Wilde's The Picture of Dorian Gray and The House of Pomegranates, with Dodd as one of the players. 

She made a number of guest appearances on various top-rated TV shows, including The Rifleman, The Andy Griffith Show, The Twilight Zone, Gomer Pyle, Hazel, Petticoat Junction, The Brady Bunch, Bewitched and The Rockford Files. Dodd also played a mental patient in the TV movie How Awful About Allan (1970), which was written by her husband, and starred Anthony Perkins and Julie Harris.

Death
Molly Dodd died at the age of 59 in Santa Monica from undisclosed causes and was interred at the Hollywood Forever Cemetery.

Filmography
 Vertigo (1958) ... beautician (uncredited)
 My Six Loves (1963) ... woman (uncredited)
 What's the Matter with Helen? (1971) ... Mrs. Rigg
 Harper Valley PTA (1978) ... Olive Glover

TV filmography

 How Awful About Allan (1970) ... unidentified patient
 The Whiz Kid and the Mystery at Riverton (1974) ... Mrs. Blake
  The Rockford Files (1977) Trouble in Chapter 17.... Housekeeper
 ABC Afterschool Special, "The Skating Rink" (1975) ... Mrs. Bayliss
 Ruby and Oswald (1978)
 The New Adventures of Heidi (1978) ... Mother Gertrude
 A Last Cry for Help (1979) ... Ms. Harrison

TV Series
Bachelor Father episode "Peter Falls in Love" as Woman at Laundromat
Playhouse 90 episode "Seven Against the Wall" as Reporter with Capone
Dennis the Menace episode "Alice's Birthday" as Mrs. Williams - clerk in store
M Squad episode "The Outsider" as Police Sgt. Connally
The DuPont Show with June Allyson episode "Threat of Evil" as May Vale
The Rifleman episode "The Jailbird" as Bessie Steel Weaver
Peter Loves Mary episode "a Star Is Born" as Singing Teacher
Gomer Pyle, U.S.M.C. episode “The Carriage Waits” as Woman #2
Bewitched 2 episodes 1970-72 as Mrs. Brock
The Twilight Zone episode "I Dream of Genie"
 The Mary Tyler Moore Show episode "The Courtship of Mary's Father's Daughter" as Woman at Party
The Brady Bunch 2 episodes "Brace Yourself" as Saleslady (1970) & "Kelly's Kids" as Mrs. Payne (1974)

References

External links
 

1921 births
1981 deaths
20th-century American actresses
American stage actresses
American television actresses
American film actresses
Burials at Hollywood Forever Cemetery